Eden is the name of some places in the U.S. state of Wisconsin:
Eden, Wisconsin, a village
Eden (town), Fond du Lac County, Wisconsin, a town
Eden, Iowa County, Wisconsin, a town